Hanno Pöschl (born 2 July 1949 in Vienna, Austria) is an Austrian actor.

Pöschl has enjoyed a long and prolific career working with directors Maximilian Schell, Peter Patzak, Rainer Werner Fassbinder, Paulus Manker, Richard Linklater, and Götz Spielmann. He also starred in several TV-Productions, and has occasionally appeared in theatrical productions at Vienna's Burgtheater and elsewhere.

For many years Pöschl was married to American dancer and choreographer Kim Duddy. He owns a café and a restaurant in Vienna.

Selected filmography
 Kassbach – Ein Porträt (1979), as Kassbach's friend
 Tales from the Vienna Woods (1979), as Alfred
 Exit... nur keine Panik (1980), as Kirchhoff
  (1981, TV film), as Ila
  (1981), as Johnny Klewer
 Querelle (1982), as Robert / Gil
 Der stille Ozean (1983, TV film), as Dr. Ascher
 Wagner (1983, TV miniseries), as Police spy
 Tramps (1983), as Rainer
 Rallye Paris-Dakar (1984), as Mike
  (1985), as Grein
 Via Mala (1985, TV miniseries), as Wirt
 Schmutz (1987)
 Zockerexpress (1991), as Harry
  (1991), as Kurti
 Inspector Rex: Murder in Schönbrunn (1994, TV episode), as Franz Karasek
 Before Sunrise (1995), as Husband on Train
 Revanche (2008), as Konecny

External links

Management Goldschmidt Renate Landkammer 

1949 births
Living people
Austrian male film actors
Austrian male television actors
20th-century Austrian male actors
21st-century Austrian male actors
Male actors from Vienna